Sau, (often mistranslated as “King”), refers to the role of spiritual leader in pre-Christian Rotuman society. The title was neither primogenitary nor held for a lifetime, but rather was cycled through the chiefs of each of Rotuma's districts.

Overview
The position of sau was primarily tied into Rotuma's pre-Christian fertility cult and the worship of the supreme deity Tagroa Siria. This is reflected in the fact that each reign was generally for the six-month ritual cycle of the Rotuman calendar. At the beginning of each sau's reign, they would be installed by the fakpure or secular ruler, and would subsequently be deified for six months, in the polity's hope that the appeasement of the sau, as a proxy for the God on earth, would result in prosperity and peace on the island.

There were also instances where the sau was female, then called "sauhani". The other major political roles in Rotuman society were the fakpure and the mua.

List of title holders

Sources 
 Fijibure
 World Statesman

Sau